Egypt, Mississippi may refer to:
Egypt, Chickasaw County, Mississippi, an unincorporated community in Chickasaw County.
Egypt, Holmes County, Mississippi, an unincorporated community in Holmes County.